Kim Myung-Joong (Hangul: 김명중; born 6 February 1985) is a South Korea football winger, who plays for Gangwon FC in K-League.

Career statistics

References

External links 

 

1985 births
Living people
Association football midfielders
South Korean footballers
Pohang Steelers players
Gimcheon Sangmu FC players
Jeonnam Dragons players
Gangwon FC players
K League 1 players